Agriculture in Macau is a minor industry in Macau, China. Around 2% of Macau's land is used for agriculture.

History
Macau has been fully dependent on food import since early ages, mainly from Mainland China.

Produce
Macau has a small land under cultivation to produce fresh vegetables. It has a very small livestock industry supplying chickens and ducks to restaurants. There is a small fishing fleets in Macau which supplies fishes to restaurants and fish markets.

Economy
Agriculture sector contributes around 1% of its gross domestic product (GDP). It employs around less than 1% of the workforce in Macau.

Tourism
 Natural and Agrarian Museum

See also
 Economy of Macau

References

Economy of Macau
Agriculture in China